Hyperdexion was a village of ancient Lesbos. This village provided epithets for Zeus Hyperdexios and Athena Hyperdexia.

The site of Hyperdexion is unlocated.

References

Populated places in the ancient Aegean islands
Former populated places in Greece
Ancient Lesbos